Rb 74, RB 74, Rb-74 or Rb.74 may refer to:

Rubidium-74, an isotope of rubidium
The Swedish designation for the AIM-9L Sidewinder air-to-air missile
The Swedish designation for the AIM-9M Sidewinder air-to-air missile
Service designation for the Senne Railway
A regional railway route in Bavaria
A regional railway route in Baden-Württemberg
A regional railway route in Berlin and Brandenburg
BAE Wolf, a tugboat in the Ecuadorian Navy